Weiner is a city in Poinsett County, Arkansas, United States. The population was 716 at the 2010 census. It is included in the Jonesboro, Arkansas Metropolitan Statistical Area.

Geography
Weiner is located at  (35.620713, -90.901107).

Education 

Weiner is served by the Harrisburg School District. Weiner Elementary School is located in the city. Residents are also zoned to Harrisburg Middle School and Harrisburg High School.

On July 1, 2010, the Weiner School District consolidated into the Harrisburg School District. Weiner High School, then under the Harrisburg school district, closed in 2013.

Demographics

2020 census

As of the 2020 United States census, there were 647 people, 337 households, and 239 families residing in the city.

2000 census
At the 2000 census there were 760 people, 306 households, and 217 families residing in Weiner. The racial makeup of Weiner was 98.55% White, 0.53% Black or African American, 0.39% Native American and 0.53% Asian.  0.66% of the population were Hispanic or Latino of any race.
Of the 306 households 33.5% had children under the age of 18 living with them, 57.5% were married couples living together, 2.0% had a female householder with no husband present, and 2.0% were non-families. 3.0.5% of households were one person and 2.0% were one person aged 65 or older.  The average household size was 2.48 and the average family size was 2.98.

The age distribution was 25.0% under the age of 18, 8.6% from 18 to 24, 28.7% from 25 to 44, 21.3% from 45 to 64, and 16.4% 65 or older.  The median age was 37 years. For every 100 females, there were 97.4 males.  For every 100 females age 18 and over, there were 90.0 males.

The median household income was in Weiner was $32,125, and the median family income  was $42,222. Males had a median income of $25,789 versus $20,804 for females. The per capita income for the city was $18,222.  About 6.7% of families and 9.3% of the population were below the poverty line, including 9.4% of those under age 18 and 12.4% of those age 65 or over.

Gallery

References

External links
CityOfWeiner.org  - Official City Website

Cities in Poinsett County, Arkansas
Cities in Arkansas
Jonesboro metropolitan area